Propionyl chloride (also propanoyl chloride) is the organic compound with the formula CH3CH2C(O)Cl.  It is the acyl chloride derivative of propionic acid. It undergoes the characteristic reactions of acyl chlorides. It is a colorless, corrosive, volatile liquid.

It is used as a reagent for organic synthesis.  In derived chiral amides and esters, the methylene protons are diastereotopic.

Synthesis
Propionyl chloride is industrially produced by chlorination of propionic acid with phosgene:
CH3CH2CO2H  + COCl2 → CH3CH2COCl +  HCl  +  CO2

References

Acyl chlorides
Reagents for organic chemistry